Claude Lamy is a Canadian former swimmer of the 1980s.

Lamy, a native of Quebec, was predominantly a freestyle swimmer and trained with Université Laval. He was a member of the gold medal-winning  relay team at the 1986 Commonwealth Games in Edinburgh, swimming in the heats. At the 1987 Pan American Games in Indianapolis, Lamy claimed a bronze medal in the 50 m freestyle and won two relay silver medals. He came sixth in the 50 m freestyle at the 1987 Summer Universiade in Zagreb.

References

Year of birth missing (living people)
Living people
Canadian male freestyle swimmers
Sportspeople from Sorel-Tracy
Commonwealth Games gold medallists for Canada
Commonwealth Games medallists in swimming
Medallists at the 1986 Commonwealth Games
Swimmers at the 1986 Commonwealth Games
Competitors at the 1987 Summer Universiade
Swimmers at the 1987 Pan American Games
Medalists at the 1987 Pan American Games
Pan American Games silver medalists for Canada
Pan American Games bronze medalists for Canada
Pan American Games medalists in swimming